Kodersdorf is a railway station  within the municipality of Horka, Saxony, Germany. Closest populated places are Kodersdorf and Mückenhain, though. The station lies on the Berlin–Görlitz railway, train services are operated by Ostdeutsche Eisenbahn.

Train services
The station is served by the following services: 

regional service  Hoyerswerda – Görlitz
regional service  Cottbus – Weißwasser – Görlitz – Zittau

Service  runs hourly in each direction. Due to construction works along Węgliniec–Roßlau railway  is temporarily not operating.

References

External links
Ostdeutsche Eisenbahn website

Railway stations in Saxony